

Q

References

Lists of words